Meatable is a Dutch biotechnology company aimed at cultured meat, particularly pork.

History

Origins 
Meatable was co-founded by Krijn de Nood, Daan Luining, and Mark Kotter in 2018. Luining previously worked with Mark Post at Maastricht University to develop the world's first cultured meat hamburger in 2013, and then in 2016 at New Harvest in New York, where he met Kotter, the main inventor of opti-ox technology. Then Luining met De Nood at a management consultancy, and the three decided to found Meatable. As a start-up company, it began operating on the campus of Delft University of Technology. The company reported in September 2018 that it had succeeded in growing meat using pluripotent stem cells from animal umbilical cords. Although such cells are reportedly difficult to work with, Meatable claimed to be able to direct them to behave to become muscle or fat cells as needed. The major advantage is that this technique bypasses fetal bovine serum, meaning that no animal has to be killed to produce meat. it was one of the first start-ups to pass the hurdle of eliminating fetal bovine serum. On 26 September 2018, Luining represented Meatable at a round table discussion on cultured meat in the Dutch House of Representatives. In early October 2018, Meatable attracted 3.5 million euros in funding from investors. At the time, the price of producing only a small bite of cultured meat was still thousands of euros.

Proof of concept 
Meatable showcased itself at the Consumer Electronics Show (CES) in Las Vegas on 7 January 2020. The start-up stated it sought to present its proof of concept before the end of the year, and then enter the market in 2022. By then, Meatable was working with scientists from Cambridge and Stanford to produce a hamburger within three weeks from a single stem cell via a process the company had patented. In February, it said it planned to have constructed a pilot plant by early 2022. In July 2020, the city of Delft announced it was going to invest 1.5 million euros in developing the Biotech Campus; Meatable was one of the four innovative companies operating there at the time benefiting from the investment. At the end of 2020, Meatable presented its proof of concept: a cultivated pork sausage.

Raising funds 
In March 2021, Meatable obtained funding from various investors worth 40 million euros (47 million US dollars), on top of the 10 million euros it already had at its disposal. Investors included Dutch food, health and materials multinational DSM, and Rick Klausner, former CEO of the Bill & Melinda Gates Foundation. Their total capital was then about 53 million euros (60 million US dollars). By April 2021, the staff of Meatable had grown to over 40 people with 15 different nationalities, representing many different fields and coming from many universities. They estimated the EFSA's regulatory approval for their product in 2023, and were aiming for large-scale availability in shops in 2025. Their future production facility was to produce 5,000 kilograms of cultured meat a day by that time.

On 13 September 2021, Meatable announced that it had entered into an agreement with DSM in order to 'make cultured meat affordable and accessible on a large scale.' The two companies citing the challenge of reducing the costs of the growth medium (50 to 90% of total production costs) and the quest for the best taste and texture as reasons for their cooperation going forward.

References

External links
 

Biotechnology companies of the Netherlands
Cellular agriculture
Food and drink companies of the Netherlands